Inermestoloides is a genus of longhorn beetles of the subfamily Lamiinae, containing the following species:

 Inermestoloides birai Bezark, Galileo & Santos-Silva, 2016
Inermestoloides drumonti Bezark, Galileo & Santos-Silva, 2016
Inermestoloides ecuadorensis Bezark, Galileo & Santos-Silva, 2016
Inermestoloides flavus Galileo & Santos-Silva, 2016
Inermestoloides praeapicealba Breuning, 1966
 Inermestoloides rumuara Martins & Galileo, 2006

References

Desmiphorini